The Commission on Legal Empowerment of the Poor was an independent international organization, hosted by the United Nations Development Programme (UNDP), and established in 2005 as the “first global initiative to focus on the link between exclusion, poverty, and the law.”   Drawing upon three years of research, the Commission proposed strategies for creating inclusive development initiatives that would empower those living in poverty through increased protections and rights.  Its final 2008 report, Making the Law Work for Everyone, argued that as many as 4 billion people worldwide are “robbed of the chance to better their lives and climb out of poverty, because they are excluded from the rule of law”.  In response, the Report proposed four “pillars” for legal empowerment of the poor (LEP), which, the Commission argued, would enable those living in poverty to become partners in, rather than passive recipients of, development programs.  These four pillars are: access to justice and the rule of law, property rights, labor rights, and business rights.

Upon concluding its research and producing its final report, the Commission on Legal Empowerment of the Poor ceased to exist as an independent organization.  However, the Commission’s findings continue to be an integral part of the UNDP’s Initiative on Legal Empowerment of the Poor, and have contributed to the creation of similar LEP initiatives in organizations such as the World Bank and the Open Society Foundations.

History of Legal Empowerment of the Poor 
Before legal empowerment for the poor (LEP) emerged as a conceptual tool in 2003, development scholars such as Dan Banik argued that “the relationship between law and development in the international development discourse was traditionally very narrowly focused on law, lawyers and state institutions.” The result, more often than not, was a “top-down” approach to development, in which aid initiatives often overlooked or excluded the voices of the very people they intended to help 

Legal empowerment of the poor, by contrast, sought to bring these previously excluded voices into the development discussion, while at the same time working to expand the rights and protections afforded to those living in poverty.  Stephen Golub, one of the founding scholars in the field, argued that legal empowerment “puts community-driven and rights-based development into effect by offering concrete mechanisms, involving but not limited to legal services, that alleviate poverty, advance the rights of the disadvantaged, and make the rule of law more of a reality for them”.  Drawing upon these principles and bolstered by the UN’s Millennium Development Goals, the Commission on Legal Empowerment of the Poor emerged as an effort to convert theories of LEP into action.

Founding of the Commission 

The Commission on Legal Empowerment of the Poor, co-chaired by former U.S. secretary of state Madeleine Albright and Hernando de Soto, Peruvian economist and founder of the Institute for Liberty and Democracy (ILD), was launched in 2005 by a group of developing and industrialized countries including Canada, Denmark, Egypt, Finland, Guatemala, Iceland, India, Norway, Sweden, South Africa, Tanzania and the United Kingdom, and completed its work in 2008.

Members 

The Commission on Legal Empowerment of the Poor (CLEP) was made up of influential policymakers and practitioners from around the world who were believed to be uniquely well-positioned to advocate among their peers for legal reforms in developing countries. Given its unique structure, CLEP was seen as a powerful catalyst for change among global leaders and within the development community.

Commissioners 

 Fazle Hasan Abed, Founder and Chairperson, BRAC, Bangladesh
 Lloyd Axworthy, former Minister of Foreign Affairs for Canada
 Leszek Balcerowicz, President of the National Bank of Poland
 Lakhdar Brahimi, former Special Representative to the U.N. Secretary General
 Gordon Brown, Prime Minister, United Kingdom
 Fernando Cardoso, former President of Brazil
 Shirin Ebadi, Nobel Peace Prize Laureate, Iran
 Ashraf Ghani, Dean of Kabul University and former Minister of Finance for Afghanistan
 Prince Hassan bin Talal, President of the Club of Rome
 Muhammad Medhat Hassanein, former Minister of Finance for Egypt
 Hilde Frafjord Johnson, former Minister of International Development, Norway
 Anthony Kennedy, Associate Justice, United States Supreme Court
 Allan Larsson, former Minister of Finance for Sweden
 Clotilde Aniouvi Medegan Nougbode, President of the High Court of Benin
 Benjamin Mkapa, former President of the United Republic of Tanzania
 Mike Moore, former Prime Minister of New Zealand, former Director General of the WTO
 Milinda Moragoda, former Minister of Economic Reforms, Science and Technology, Sri Lanka
 Syed Tanwir H. Naqvi, former Chairman of the National Reconstruction Bureau of Pakistan
 Mary Robinson, former President of Ireland and former High Commissioner of Human Rights
 Arjun Kumar Sengupta, Chairman of the National Commission for Enterprises in the Unorganized Sector  of India, United Nations Independent Expert on Human Rights and Extreme Poverty
 Lindiwe Sisulu, Minister of Housing, Republic of South Africa
 Lawrence Summers, President of Harvard University, USA
 Erna Witoelar, UN Special Ambassador for MDGs in Asia & the Pacific
 Ernesto Zedillo, former President of Mexico

Board of Advisers 

Robert Annibale, Global Director of Microfinance, Citigroup
Marek Belka, Executive Secretary of the United Nations Economic Commission for Europe (UNECE)
Diego Hidalgo, Founder, Club of Madrid
Donald Kaberuka, President, African Development Bank Group
Jean Lemierre, President, European Bank for Reconstruction and Development
Luis Alberto Moreno, President, Inter-American Development Bank
Kumi Naidoo, CEO, CIVICUS
Sheela Patel, Founder, Society for the Promotion of Area Resources (SPARC)
Jan Peterson, Chair, Huairou Commission
Juan Somavia, Director, International Labor Organization
Anna Tibaijuka, Executive Director, UN HABITAT
Victoria Tauli-Corpuz, Chairperson, UN Permanent Forum on Indigenous Issues
John Watson, President, CARE Canada
Francisco Garza Zambrano, President, Cemex North America
Robert Zoellick, President, World Bank

Organization 

Advocates of LEP argued that the only way to break new ground on legal empowerment was to learn from the experiences of those who live and work in slums and settlements around the world. Thus, CLEP, in conducting its research, partnered with grassroots organizations, governments and institutions to hear about the legal challenges faced by the poor. 22 National and Regional Consultations and 5 technical workgroups were hosted in Africa, South and Central Americas, Asia, the Middle East and Europe. These national and regional processes grounded the work of Legal Empowerment in local realities, and contributed to recommendations that reflected diverse cultural, socio-economic and political environments.
CLEP’s final report, Making The Law Work For Everyone, argued that LEP initiatives must be grounded in four foundational “pillars”:

•	Access to Justice and the Rule of law:  including the right to legal identity, removal of discriminatory laws against the poor, and increased access to both traditional and alternative justice systems

•	Property rights: including recognition of alternative methods of individual and collective ownership

•	Labor rights: workers’ rights, protections, and benefits

•	Business rights: access to credit and support for the poor (particularly poor women) to start and operate small businesses

Critiques of the Commission 

Though scholars and practitioners of LEP programs applaud the CLEP for bringing legal empowerment of the poor into the international limelight, many have critiqued its 2008 report on both technical and theoretical grounds.  For example, Matthew Stephens, in his article "The Commission on Legal Empowerment of the Poor: An Opportunity Missed," argued that the Report lacked sufficient empirical data.  Julio Faundez  argued that the Commission's policy recommendations were too vague to be implemented effectively.

References

External links 
 https://web.archive.org/web/20080218060641/http://legalempowerment.undp.org/
 https://www.youtube.com/LegalEmpowerment1
 https://web.archive.org/web/20100221161016/http://lepknowledgebank.ning.com/
 http://www.snap-undp.org/lepknowledgebank
 https://web.archive.org/web/20101026195806/http://www.soros.org/initiatives/justice/focus/legal_capacity/projects/lep
 http://www.hiil.org/
 https://web.archive.org/web/20100906025700/http://www.sum.uio.no/research/poverty/anlep/
 http://web.worldbank.org/WBSITE/EXTERNAL/TOPICS/EXTLAWJUSTICE/EXTJUSFORPOO/0,,menuPK:3282947~pagePK:149018~piPK:149093~theSitePK:3282787,00.html
 http://lup.lub.lu.se/luur/download?func=downloadFile&recordOId=1613415&fileOId=1613430

Research on poverty
International development organizations
United Nations Development Programme